Nucleotide sugars are the activated forms of monosaccharides. Nucleotide sugars act as glycosyl donors in glycosylation reactions. Those reactions are catalyzed by a group of enzymes called glycosyltransferases.

History
The anabolism of oligosaccharides - and, hence, the role of nucleotide sugars - was not clear until the 1950s when Leloir and his coworkers found that the key enzymes in this process are the glycosyltransferases.  These enzymes transfer a glycosyl group from a sugar nucleotide to an acceptor.

Biological importance and energetics
To act as glycosyl donors, those monosaccharides should exist in a highly energetic form. This occurs as a result of a reaction between nucleoside triphosphate (NTP) and glycosyl monophosphate (phosphate at anomeric carbon). The recent discovery of the reversibility of many glycosyltransferase-catalyzed reactions calls into question the designation of sugar nucleotides as 'activated' donors.

Types
There are nine sugar nucleotides in humans which act as glycosyl donors and they can be classified depending on the type of the nucleoside forming them:
Uridine Diphosphate: UDP-α-D-Glc, UDP-α-D-Gal, UDP-α-D-GalNAc, UDP-α-D-GlcNAc, UDP-α-D-GlcA, UDP-α-D-Xyl
Guanosine Diphosphate: GDP-α-D-Man, GDP-β-L-Fuc.
Cytidine Monophosphate: CMP-β-D-Neu5Ac; in humans, it is the only nucleotide sugar in the form of nucleotide monophosphate.
Cytidine Diphosphate: CDP-D-Ribitol (i.e. CMP-[ribitol phosphate]); though not a sugar, the phosphorylated sugar alcohol ribitol phosphate is incorporated into matriglycan as if it were a monosaccharide.

In other forms of life many other sugars are used and various donors are utilized for them. All five of the common nucleosides are used as a base for a nucleotide sugar donor somewhere in nature.  As examples, CDP-glucose and TDP-glucose  give rise to various other forms of CDP and TDP-sugar donor nucleotides.

Structures
Listed below are the structures of some nucleotide sugars (one example from each type).

Relationship to disease
Normal metabolism of nucleotide sugars is very important. Any malfunction in any contributing enzyme will lead to a certain disease  for example:
Inclusion body myopathy: is a congenital disease resulted from altered function of UDP-GlcNAc epimerase .
Macular corneal dystrophy: is a congenital disease resulted from malfunction of GlcNAc-6-sulfotransferase.
Congenital disorder in α-1,3 mannosyl transferase will result in a variety of clinical symptoms, e.g. hypotonia, psychomotor retardation, liver fibrosis and various feeding problems.

Relationship to drug discovery
The development of chemoenzymatic strategies to generate large libraries of non-native sugar nucleotides has enabled a process referred to as glycorandomization where these sugar nucleotide libraries serve as donors for permissive glycosyltransferases to afford differential glycosylation of a wide range of pharmaceuticals and complex natural product-based leads.

See also
Carbohydrate chemistry
EamA
Glycorandomization
Glycosyltransferase
Nucleotide sugars metabolism

References

External links
 

Metabolism
Coenzymes
Carbohydrate chemistry
Carbohydrates
Nucleotides